Twin Bridges may refer:
Twin bridges, a pair of parallel bridges

Inhabited places in the United States
 Twin Bridges, California
 Twin Bridges, Montana
 Twin Bridges, Missouri, the former name of Evergreen, Missouri
 Twin Bridges, Nevada

Bridges

United States
 Bi-State Vietnam Gold Star Bridges, a pair of twin bridges that cross the Ohio River between Henderson, Kentucky and Evansville, Indiana
 Queensway Twin Bridges, Long Beach, California
 Twin Bridges (Danville, Indiana), listed on the NRHP in Indiana
 Twin Bridges (Philadelphia), Pennsylvania
 Twin Bridges-West Paden Covered Bridge No. 121, a historic wooden covered bridge Columbia County, Pennsylvania
 The Twin Bridges or I-74 Bridge, connecting Bettendorf, Iowa and Moline, Illinois

Other places
 Ponts Jumeaux (French for Twin Bridges), Southern France

Other uses
 Twin Bridges State Park, northeastern Oklahoma
 Twin Bridges Trailhead, near Strawberry, California

See also
 Twin Bridge (disambiguation)
 Twin Bridges Airport (disambiguation)